Dave Cullinan (born May 8, 1968) is an American former BMX racer and professional mountain bike downhill and dual slalom athlete. He is the winner of the 1992 UCI Downhill Mountain Bike World Championships.

References

External links

Living people
Downhill mountain bikers
1968 births
American male cyclists
American mountain bikers
People from Durango, Colorado
UCI Mountain Bike World Champions (men)
20th-century American people